Dave Cumberford was an Australian association football player.

Playing career

International career
Cumberford played three matches for Australia, all in 1922. He played in Australia's first three full international matches, all against New Zealand.

References

External links

See also
Jock Cumberford

Australian soccer players
Australia international soccer players
Year of death missing
Year of birth missing
Association football defenders